AHA, Aha, or aha may refer to:

Arts, entertainment and media
 Aha! (TV program), an information and education TV program in the Philippines
 a-ha, a Norwegian pop music band
 Aha! (film), a 2007 Bangladeshi film
 Aha (streaming service), an Indian service offering Telugu content
 Aha! (tabloid), a newspaper published in the Czech Republic
 AHA! A Hands-On Adventure, a children's museum in Lancaster, Ohio
 Association of Hispanic Arts, a New York-based non-profit organization that promotes the work of Hispanic artists
 "Aha", a 2009 song by British singer Imogen Heap
 Aha! Insight (1978), a book by Martin Gardner

Hockey 
 Amateur Hockey Association, an amateur men's ice hockey league in Canada from 1886 to 1898
 American Hockey Association (1926–1942)
 American Hockey Association (1992–1993)
 Atlantic Hockey Association, an NCAA Men's Division I Ice Hockey conference which operates primarily in the northeastern U.S.

Organizations
 AHA Foundation, a nonprofit organization for the defense of women's rights
 Allianz vun Humanisten, Atheisten an Agnostiker, an association of humanists, atheists and agnostics based in Luxembourg
 American Heart Association, a non-profit organization in the US that promotes cardiac care
 American Hebrew Academy, an American Jewish pluralistic college preparatory boarding school
 American Historical Association, the oldest and largest society of historians in the US
 American Homebrewers Association, an American trade group concerned with the promotion of craft beer and homebrewing
 American Hospital Association, a trade group founded in 1898 to the promote health care industry
 American Humane Association, an organization founded in 1877 dedicated to the welfare of animals and children
 American Humanist Association, an educational organization in the US that advances secular humanism
 Arabian Horse Association, an organization that registers Arabian horses in the US
 Association of Hispanic Arts, a New York-based non-profit organization that promotes the work of Hispanic artists
 Atlanta Housing Authority, an organization to develop, acquire, lease and operate affordable housing
 Australian Hotels Association, an employer advocacy and lobby group representing hoteliers around Australia

People
 Rabbi Aha, fourth century rabbi in the Land of Israel
 Aha bar Jacob, third or fourth century Babylonian rabbi
 Aha b. Rava, fourth or fifth century Babylonian rabbi
 Achai Gaon, also known as Aha of Shabḥa, eighth century Talmudist and scholar

Science and technology
 Alpha hydroxy acid, a class of chemical compounds that consist of a carboxylic acid substituted with a hydroxyl group on the adjacent carbon
 Aha (wasp), a genus of Australian wasp
 Aha ha, an Aha species abbreviated as A. ha

Other uses
 Aboriginal Heritage Act 1972, Western Australian legislation also known as the AHA
 Aboriginal Heritage Act 1988, South Australian legislation also known as the AHA
 Aboriginal Heritage Act 2006, legislation of the state of Victoria, Australia, also known as the AHA
 Aha, an Egyptian phrase found on the Rhind Papyrus
 Aha (Book of Mormon), a Nephite soldier
 Ahanta language (ISO 639-3 code AHA)

See also
 Aha! (disambiguation)
 Aha experience, an insight that manifests itself suddenly
 Ahah (Book of Mormon), a Jaredite
 Aha Khani, a village in Hormozgan Province, Iran
 Hor-Aha, an Egyptian pharaoh